Akademiska Hus is a wholly owned Swedish Government enterprise with the mission to own, develop and manage property with a focus on educational and research activities — like colleges and universities — and to conduct related business. Its operations are carried out on a businesslike manner, with market rents, to generate a return. The company should also promote sustainable long-term development, according to instruction by the Government.

The company was established on October 1, 1993, after the National Board of Public Building (Swedish: Byggnadsstyrelsen) split into several smaller units, including Akademiska Hus, Vasakronan and the National Property Board of Sweden.

Criticism
Akademsika Hus has been criticised by the presidents of KTH and CTH for taking out rents that are far above market value. They also claim that it would practically be impossible for the universities to relocate and rent from anyone else. More recently Akademiska hus has received critcism from professors at KTH who claim that wages have been cut to keep up with rent. The presidents of 30 swedish universities have also argued that the systems needs to be changed to alleviate their financial situation.

See also
 Government-owned corporation
 List of government enterprises of Sweden

References

External links
Akademiska Hus - Official website (English)

Government-owned companies of Sweden
1993 establishments in Sweden
Property management companies